Paul Torday (1 August 1946 – 18 December 2013) was a British writer and the author of the comic novel Salmon Fishing in the Yemen. The book was the winner of the 2007 Bollinger Everyman Wodehouse Prize for comic writing  and was serialised on BBC Radio 4. It won the Waverton Good Read Award in 2008. It was made into a popular movie in 2011, starring Ewan McGregor and Emily Blunt.

Life
Born in 1946 in Croxdale, County Durham, and educated at the Royal Grammar School, Newcastle and Pembroke College, Oxford, Torday turned to fiction writing only later in life, and his first novel was published at the age of 59. Prior to that he was a successful businessman living in Northumberland. The inspiration for the novel stemmed from Torday's interest in both fly fishing and the Middle East. From these two strands, he weaves a political satire that centres on the world of political spin management.

His second novel is entitled The Irresistible Inheritance of Wilberforce (titled Bordeaux in the United States) and is about a man who drinks himself to death.

In 2008, he was nominated for Best Newcomer at the Galaxy British Book Awards.

Torday's third book The Girl on the Landing was published in 2009.  This novel deals principally with themes of schizophrenia and racism.

His son Piers Torday is a children's writer.

Bibliography

Novels
Torday's novels include:

(2006) Salmon Fishing in the Yemen
(2008) The Irresistible Inheritance of Wilberforce
(2009) The Girl on the Landing
(2010) The Hopeless Life Of Charlie Summers
(2011) More Than You Can Say
(2012) The Legacy of Hartlepool Hall
(2013) Light Shining in the Forest
(2016) The Death Of An Owl

The Paul Torday Memorial Prize
Paul Torday published his first novel Salmon Fishing in the Yemen aged 60. The family decided to set up this new prize in Torday's honour in 2019, celebrating first novels by authors aged 60 or over. This prize is administered by the Society of Authors.

2022

 Winner: Jane Fraser for Advent (Honno Press)
 Runner-up: Michael Mallon for The Disciple (Zuleika)

Shortlisted: 

 John Fletcher for Wuhan (Head of Zeus)
 Anthony English for Death of a Coast Watcher (Monsoon Books)
 Yvonne Bailey-Smith for The Day I Fell Off My Island (Myriad Editions)

2020

 Winner:  Donald Murray for As the Woman Lay Dreaming (Saraband)
 Runner-up: Gaby Koppel for Reparation (Honno Press)

Shortlisted:

 Georgy Alagiah for The Burning Land  (Canongate Books)
 Fiona Vigo Marshall for Find Me Falling (Fairlight Books) 
 Rosalind Stopps for Hello, My Name is May (HQ, HarperCollins Publishing)
 Euan Cameron for Madeleine (MacLehose Press)

2019
 Winner: Anne Youngson for Meet Me at the Museum (Doubleday Ireland)
 Runner-up: Norma MacMaster for Silence Under A Stone (Doubleday)

Shortlisted: 
 Su Bristow  for Sealskin (Orenda Books) 
 Sheila Llewllyn for Walking Wounded (Sceptre)
 Sally Magnusson  for The Sealwoman's Gift (Two Roads) 
 Heather Morris for The Tattooist of Auschwitz (Zaffre)

References

External links

All of Paul Torday's novels published by Orion
Interview with Torday

1946 births
2013 deaths
20th-century British male writers
20th-century British novelists
21st-century British male writers
21st-century British novelists
Alumni of Pembroke College, Oxford
British male novelists
People educated at the Royal Grammar School, Newcastle upon Tyne